IWG plc, formerly Regus, is a British holding company. It provides serviced offices under several brand-names, including Regus. It was started in Brussels, Belgium, by Mark Dixon in 1989. It is registered in Saint Helier, Jersey, and has its head office in Zug, Switzerland. It is listed on the London Stock Exchange and is a constituent of the FTSE 250 Index.

History
The company was founded as "Regus" by English entrepreneur Mark Dixon with the objective of providing flexible office space to customers in Brussels in 1989. In 1994, Regus entered Latin America with a centre in São Paulo and Asia with its first centre in Beijing.

2000s 
The company completed a successful IPO on the London Stock Exchange in 2000. In 2001, it acquired Stratis Business Centers, a U.S.-based network of franchised business centres. Five Regus employees died in the September 11 attacks, as Regus had a business centre on the 93rd floor of the South Tower. The company was criticised for a lack of response to the victims' families, though a Regus official said they had made "proactive outreach to every family of the team members who are missing."

In 2002, the company sold a controlling stake (58%) of its UK business to Rex 2002 Limited, a company created by the private equity firm Alchemy Partners. This move raised £51 million for the company, which had been facing severe financial difficulties. In 2003, Regus filed for Chapter 11 bankruptcy protection for its U.S. business, which had been struggling in the wake of the dot-com bubble. A year later, it took its U.S. business out of Chapter 11 after restructuring, financed by its share of the profitable UK business.

The company acquired HQ Global Workplaces, workplace provider based in the U.S. in 2004. It re-acquired the Regus UK business in 2006 for £88 million. The company went on to acquire Laptop Lane, a chain of American airport business centres, later that year. In 2006, the company entered partnerships with Air France-KLM and American Airlines for preferred access for business travellers and in 2007, it entered a partnership with American Express for preferred access for their Business Platinum cardholders.

In 2007, Regus opened business centres in Bulgaria and the Middle East. In June 2008, Regus introduced Businessworld, a multi-level membership service for flexible access to its services in any  of its  locations. Effective 14 October 2008, Regus Group plc became Regus plc. Regus plc was created as a holding company for Regus Group plc, to establish the company's headquarters in Luxembourg and its registered office in Jersey. Regus has maintained a policy of expansion, opening new business centres. It has also renegotiated some leasing agreements with property owners in the UK to save money, warning owners that the vehicles holding the leases could go into administration (bankruptcy); this has angered the British property industry.

2010s 
On 5 July 2012, UK Prime Minister David Cameron announced that Regus would provide 30,000 young entrepreneurs across England with access to its network of offices, complementing the Government's StartUp Loans scheme managed by James Caan. On 19 February 2013, the firm took control of MWB BE, a large UK-based serviced office provider with a £65.6m cash bid.

In December 2016, under a scheme of arrangement, the company established a new holding company IWG (International Workplace Group) and announced its intention to move its base outside the European Union referring to the "increasingly complex legislative environment". The new head office was established in Zug, Switzerland.

As of 2019, IWG has approximately 3,000 coworking spaces in around 120 countries.

See also

WeWork

References

External links

 
 Salter, Chuck. "Office of the Future", Fast Company, Issue 33, March 2000, page 272.
 Holusha, John. "Commercial Property/Business Centers; Modern Office for Rent: Daily Rates Available", The New York Times, 20 May 2001.

Companies listed on the London Stock Exchange
Holding companies established in 1989
Companies based in Luxembourg City
Companies that filed for Chapter 11 bankruptcy in 2003
Property services companies of the United Kingdom
Coworking space providers
1989 establishments in Belgium